Mary Tudor (18 March 1496 – 25 June 1533) was an English princess who was briefly Queen of France as the third wife of King Louis XII. Louis was more than 30 years her senior. Mary was the fifth child of Henry VII of England and Elizabeth of York, and the youngest to survive infancy.

Following Louis's death, Mary married Charles Brandon, 1st Duke of Suffolk. Performed secretly in France, the marriage occurred without the consent of Mary's brother Henry VIII. The marriage necessitated the intervention of Thomas Wolsey; Henry eventually pardoned the couple, after they paid a large fine. Mary had four children with Suffolk. Through her older daughter, Frances, she was the maternal grandmother of Lady Jane Grey, the de facto queen of England for nine days in July 1553.

Early life

Mary was the fifth child of Henry VII of England and Elizabeth of York, and the youngest to survive infancy. She was born at Sheen Palace, on 18 March 1496. A privy seal bill dated from midsummer 1496 authorizes a payment of 50 shillings to her nurse, Anne Skeron. Also, Erasmus stated that she was four years old when he visited the royal nursery in 1499–1500. At age six, she was given her own household, complete with "a staff of gentlewomen assigned to wait upon her", a schoolmaster, and a physician. She was given instruction in French, Latin, music, dancing, and embroidery. Her Governess was Joan Vaux, whom she called Mother Guildford; the two shared a close relationship and Mary was furious when Joan was sent back to England upon her arrival in France.

As children, Mary and her brother, the future King Henry VIII, shared a close friendship. He named his first surviving child, the future Queen Mary I, in her honour. They lost their mother when Mary was just six and, given the number of bills paid to her apothecary from 1504 to 1509, it would appear that Mary's own health was fragile.

She was known in her youth as one of the most beautiful princesses in Europe; Erasmus said of her that "Nature never formed anything more beautiful."

In 1506, during a visit from Philip I of Castile, Mary was called to entertain the guests, dancing and playing the lute and clavichord. In September 1506, Philip died, and on 21 December 1507, Mary was betrothed to his son Charles, later Holy Roman Emperor. The betrothal was called off in 1513.

First marriage: Queen of France

Cardinal Wolsey negotiated a peace treaty with France, and on 9 October 1514, at the age of 18, Mary married the 52-year-old King Louis XII of France at Abbeville. She was accompanied to France by four English maids of honour (one of whom was Anne Boleyn) under the supervision of her old governess Lady or "Mother" Guildford, who acted as her principal lady-in-waiting.

Despite two previous marriages, Louis had no living sons, and sought to produce one. But he died on 1 January 1515, less than three months after marrying Mary, reputedly worn out by his exertions in the bedchamber, but more likely from the effects of gout. Their union produced no children. Following Louis's death, the new king Francis I made unsuccessful attempts to arrange a second marriage for Mary.

Second marriage: Duchess of Suffolk

Mary had been unhappy in her marriage of state to King Louis XII, as she was almost certainly already in love with Charles Brandon, 1st Duke of Suffolk. King Henry VIII was aware of Mary's feelings; letters from her in 1515 indicated that she had agreed to wed Louis only on condition that "if she survived him, she should marry whom she liked." But Henry VIII wanted any future marriage to be to his advantage. The King's Council, not wishing to see Charles Brandon gain further power at court, was also opposed to the match.

Meanwhile, rumours swirled in France that she would wed either Antoine, Duke of Lorraine, or Charles III, Duke of Savoy. At one point, even King Francis I, perhaps in hope of his wife Queen Claude's death, was one of Mary's suitors in the first week of her widowhood; Mary asserted that she had given him her confidence in order to avoid his overtures. A pair of French friars went so far as to warn Mary that she must not wed Charles Brandon because he "had traffickings with the devil."

When King Henry VIII sent Brandon to bring Mary back to England in late January 1515, he made the Duke promise that he would not propose to her. Once in France, Mary persuaded Charles to abandon that pledge; Charles later wrote to the King stating he "never saw a woman so weep." The couple wed in secret at the Hotel de Clugny in Paris on 3 March 1515 in the presence of just 10 people, among them King Francis I. Technically, this was treason as Charles Brandon had married a royal princess without King Henry's consent. Thus Henry was outraged, and the privy council urged that Charles be imprisoned or executed; Mary, as royalty and the King's favourite sister, was safe from execution.

Because of the intervention of Thomas Wolsey and Henry's affection for both his sister and Charles, the couple were given only a heavy fine of £24,000, to be paid to the King in yearly instalments of £1000; the whole of Mary's dowry from King Louis XII of £200,000; and the gold plate and jewels King Louis had given or promised her. The £24,000, approximately equivalent to £7,200,000 today, was later reduced by the King. They officially later married on 13 May 1515 at Greenwich Palace in the presence of King Henry VIII and his courtiers. In 1528, Charles secured a papal bull from Pope Clement VII legitimizing the marriage.

Mary was Charles Brandon's third wife, and he had two daughters, Anne and Mary, by his second marriage to Anne Browne, who had died in 1511. Mary raised the girls with her own children. Even after her second marriage, Mary was normally referred to at the English court as the Queen of France, and was not known as the Duchess of Suffolk in her lifetime, despite being legally allowed to be. Mary spent most of her time at the Duke's country seat of Westhorpe Hall in Suffolk.

In the late 1520s, relations between King Henry VIII and his sister Mary were strained when she opposed the King's attempt to obtain an annulment of his marriage to Catherine of Aragon, whom Mary had known for many years. Mary strongly disliked Anne Boleyn (King Henry's intended wife), whom she had first encountered in France.   Anne and her sister Mary Boleyn had been among the maids of honour in the entourage that had accompanied Mary to France for her wedding to King Louis XII.

In March 1532, Venetian Ambassador Carlo Capello wrote of an incident where one of the chief gentlemen in the service of the said Duke of Norfolk, with 20 followers, assaulted and killed in the sanctuary of Westminster Sir William Pennington chief gentleman and kinsman of the Duke of Suffolk. In consequence of this, the whole Court was in an uproar. Though it was said to be caused by a private quarrel, he was "assured it was owing to opprobrious language uttered against Madam Anne by his Majesty's sister, the Duchess of Suffolk, Queen Dowager of France.". Anne Boleyn was the niece of the Duke of Norfolk  mentioned by Capello.

Death

Mary suffered multiple bouts of illness, requiring treatments over her lifetime. She died, age 37, at Westhorpe Hall, Suffolk, on 25 June 1533, having never fully recovered from the sweating sickness she caught in 1528. The cause of death has been speculated to have been angina, tuberculosis, appendicitis, or cancer.

As an English princess, daughter of a king, sister to the current king, and a dowager queen of France, Mary Tudor's funeral and interment was conducted with much heraldic ceremony. A requiem mass was held at Westminster Abbey. Her body was embalmed and held in state at Westhorpe Hall for three weeks.

Funeral 
On 22 July 1533, a delegation from France joined the English delegation for the lavish funeral ceremony. Her daughter Frances was chief mourner, accompanied by her husband and siblings. As was tradition, neither Mary's husband nor her brother the king attended.

The funeral procession included 100 torch bearers, clergy carrying the cross, six horses pulling the hearse, other nobility and 100 of the duke's yeomen. A requiem mass and burial at Bury St. Edmunds Abbey followed the next day. At the funeral, her step-daughters, Anne and Mary, pushed themselves to the head of the cortège just before the coffin was lowered into the crypt of the Abbey, much to the consternation of their half-siblings.

Remains 
Five years later, when the monastery was dissolved, Mary's body was removed to nearby St. Mary's Church, Bury St. Edmunds. In 1784, her remains were disinterred, her coffin opened, and locks of her hair were taken by Horace Walpole, Dorothy Bentinck, Duchess of Portland, and several others.

Appearance and personality 
Upon her arrival in France, Mary was described as being "handsome and well favoured, were not her eyes and eyebrows too light; she is slight, rather than defective from corpulence, and conducts herself with so much grace, and has such good manners, that for her age of 18 years—and she does not look more—she is a paradise."

Contemporaries lauded her beauty, including her husband, Louis XII, who described her as a "nymph from heaven". She regularly took part in masques at her brother's court, and enjoyed "hearing singing, instrumental music, and dancing".

Mary was described as "very lively", with one nobleman noting "[she] is never still." She was also said to be cheerful and affable; this is shown when, upon meeting her future husband Louis for the first time, she blew him a kiss in greeting.

Family 
Mary and Charles had four children, two daughters and two sons:

 Henry Brandon (11 March 1516 – 1522)
 Lady Frances Brandon (16 July 1517 – 20 November 1559), who married Henry Grey, 3rd Marquess of Dorset, and was the mother of Lady Jane Grey.
 Lady Eleanor Brandon (1519 – 27 September 1547), who married Henry Clifford, 2nd Earl of Cumberland.
 Henry Brandon, 1st Earl of Lincoln (c. 1523 – March 1534).

Mary and Charles raised their children at their home at Westhorpe Hall. Their two sons, both named Henry, are commonly mistaken for being the same son.  Both boys died when they were children.

Mary's widower later married their son's (Henry Brandon, Earl of Lincoln) betrothed, who was also his ward, the 14-year-old Catherine Willoughby, by whom he had his two youngest sons.

In literature 
She is the main character in several historical fiction novels:

 When Knighthood Was in Flower, by Edwin Caskoden (the pen name of Charles Major) (1898), the novel was the source material for both the Davies film directed by Robert Vignola and the Disney film, The Sword and the Rose.
 The Reluctant Queen by Molly Costain Haycraft (1962)
 Mary, Queen of France by Jean Plaidy (1964)
 Princess of Desire by Maureen Peters (1970)
 Rose of England by Hilda Lewis (1977)
 Heart of a Rose by Hilda Lewis (1978)
 The Secret Bride by Diane Haeger (2008)
 The Last Boleyn by Karen Harper
 Three Sisters, Three Queens by Philippa Gregory (2016)

In other media 
 In The Tudors (television series, 2007), Mary Tudor is called by her sister's name, Margaret (to avoid confusion with Henry VIII's daughter Mary I of England), and played by Gabrielle Anwar. She is depicted as marrying the King of Portugal rather than France (as Francis I had already been introduced in the show as King of France, Mary/Margaret could not be shown marrying his predecessor, Louis XII). The fictional Portuguese king lives only a few days until she smothers him in his sleep.  She then marries Charles Brandon.
In The Spanish Princess (television mini series, 2019–2020), Mary Tudor is a main character. Isla Merrick-Lawless portrays a younger version in Season 1 and Sai Bennett portrays an older version in Season 2.
 In The Sword and the Rose (Walt Disney and Perce Pearce film, 1953), Mary Tudor (played by Glynis Johns) falls for the non-noble Brandon (played by Richard Todd) and attempts to run away from England with him, but is forced by Henry VIII to marry the King of France. She relies on her friend, the Duke of Buckingham, to help her, with nearly disastrous consequences.

Ancestry

Notes

References

 
 
 
 
Calendar of State Papers, Venice.
Letters and Papers, Foreign and Domestic, Henry VIII, Volume 1, 1509 - 1514
Letters and Papers, Foreign and Domestic, Henry VIII, Volume 2, 1515 - 1518

Further reading
 Brown, Mary Croom. Mary Tudor: queen of France (1911)  online
 Chapman, Hester W. (1969), The Thistle and the Rose:  The Sisters of Henry VIII, New York:  Coward, McGann & Geoghegan, LCC .

External links

A short biography
Mary Tudor Gallery
studies about famous tapestries representing Mary Tudor
Images from the Festival Book of the Betrothal to Charles of Castile

|-

1496 births
1533 deaths
15th-century English women
15th-century English people
16th-century English women
16th-century French women
French queens consort
Dauphines of Viennois
English duchesses by marriage
English princesses
English people of Welsh descent
House of Tudor
People from Westhorpe, Suffolk
People from Richmond, London
Brandon family
Remarried royal consorts
Children of Henry VII of England
Daughters of kings